PT Net Visi Media Tbk is an Indonesian media and entertainment company. Originally formed in 2004 as Putra Insan Permata, the company changed its legal name to the current one in 2017. Headquartered in Jakarta, its activities encompassed the television broadcasting through the NET. network, talent management and streaming media service under NetVerse and previously, Zulu. Its majority shares owned by Sinergi Lintas Media, which is a part of the Indika Group.

History 
The company was established as PT Putra Insan Permata on 23 July 2004. However, the company's involvement in the media industry dates back in May 2013, when the NET. television network, which formed in 2012 by Indika executive Agus Lasmono Sudwikatmono and former Trans Media executive Wishnutama, began to air for the first time, replacing the whole terrestrial feed of Spacetoon Indonesia that was bought by the Indika Group.

On 23 March 2017, PT Putra Insan Permata changed its name to PT Net Visi Media, to reflect its focus towards the media and entertainment business. On 25 November 2020, NET. has filed for bankruptcy by Bambang Sutrisno Kusnadi through his lawyer Sadrakh Seskoadi, against the application for postponement of debt repayment obligations that was filed by the company.

On 27 December 2021, the company announced its plan to list its shares on the Indonesia Stock Exchange following month, and offer the new 765.306.100 at a price of IDR 100 per share with the public offering price ranging from IDR 190 to IDR 196 per share. On 26 January 2022, the company listed its shares through the initial public offering at a price of IDR 196 per share, while sold its 765,3 million shares to the public investors and traded under the "NETV" ticker symbol.

Operations 
Net Visi Media operates the NET. television network, which has reached 187 cities in Indonesia with 40 transmitters, along with its studios located at Mitra Gatot Subroto and The East building in Jakarta. Besides the television broadcasting, the company also operate the NetVerse streaming platform, which is a successor of the company's previous platforms Zulu and NET. Connect, and Creative Inc. content production studio.

In talent management, the company focused its synergized management in four important talents, such as key opinion leader (KOL), content creator, artist and publishing.

References

External links 
 

Indonesian companies established in 2004
Entertainment companies established in 2004
Entertainment companies of Indonesia
Mass media companies established in 2004
Mass media companies of Indonesia
Television companies of Indonesia
Companies based in Jakarta
Companies listed on the Indonesia Stock Exchange
2022 initial public offerings